Fatehpur is a town in Nakyal, Kotli District, in the Azad Kashmir, Pakistan. Fatehpur was a part of tehsil Mahnder before independence in 1947. It is located at 33° 38' 20N 73° 58' 45E ). It is 40 kilometres from Kotli city and 181 kilometres from Islamabad. Due to high altitude (1524 meters) Fatehpur is comparatively a colder place than the rest of the district.

References

Populated places in Kotli District